Izidorio Oliveira (11 October 1928 – 8 August 2021) was a Brazilian politician.

Biography 
From 1995 till 1999, he served as a member of the Chamber of Deputies.

Oliveira died of respiratory complications from COVID-19 at the age of 75.

References

1934 births
2021 deaths
Members of the Chamber of Deputies (Brazil) from Goiás
Deaths from the COVID-19 pandemic in Goiás